Rasmus Helveg Petersen (born 17 June 1968 in Copenhagen) is a Danish politician, who is a member of the Folketing for the Danish Social Liberal Party. He served as Minister for Development Cooperation from 21 November 2013 to 3 February 2014, and as Minister of Climate, Energy and Building from 3 February 2014 to 28 June 2015. He was elected into parliament at the 2019 Danish general election, having previously served from 2011 to 2015. He is the brother of Morten Helveg Petersen, who serves as a member of the European Parliament for the same party.

Political career
Petersen was first elected into parliament at the 2011 election, where he received 3,662 votes. He served as Minister for Development Cooperation from 21 November 2013 to 3 February 2014, in the Thorning-Schmidt I Cabinet. When the Socialist People's Party left the coalition, a new cabinet was formed. Here Petersen served as Minister of Climate, Energy and Building from 3 February 2014 to 28 June 2015.

In the 2015 election he received 2,151 and didn't get reelected. His election result did make him the Social Liberal Party's primary substitute in the Zealand constituency. He was called upon twice during the term: From 1 September 2015 to 31 December 2015 and from 6 September 2018 to 7 May 2019. Both times he were substitute for Zenia Stampe. Petersen ran again in the 2019 election, where he received 3,763 votes, getting elected into parliament again.

References

External links
 

|-

Living people
1968 births
Politicians from Copenhagen
20th-century Danish journalists
21st-century Danish journalists
Danish Social Liberal Party politicians
Rasmus
Government ministers of Denmark
Danish Ministers of Climate and Energy
Members of the Folketing 2011–2015
Members of the Folketing 2019–2022